Francesco Antonio Soria (1730–1799) was an Italian writer. He is best known for a biographical dictionary of Neapolitan historians: Memoria storico-critich degli storici napolitani (1781–1782, Naples).

He was born in Naples and became a priest. He also published some hagiographies and a history of the reign of Ottoman sultan Mehmed II.

Works
Memoria storico-critich degli storici napolitani

References

1730 births
1799 deaths
18th-century Italian writers
18th-century Italian male writers
Italian writers
Italian biographers
Writers from Naples